The Acequia Madre, in Las Vegas, New Mexico, is a historic acequia which was built at the time of Las Vegas' settlement in 1835–36.  It was listed on the National Register of Historic Places in 1987.

It runs from the Gallinas River to the approximate intersection of S. Pacific and U.S. Route 85 in Las Vegas.

"Description: An earthen irrigation channel; 3-5 feet wide; and 2-3 feet
deep. Leaving the Gallinas River at a point due northeast of Taos
Street; proceeding southwest through unplatted land to the northeast
corner of Block 3 of the Baca and Sandoval Addition; proceeding south
along the east boundary of Blocks 3-4 of the Baca and Sandoval Addition
and Blocks E and F of the Original Town; proceeding through, then along
the west edge of, then through Block L of the Original Town; proceeding
south along the east boundary of blocks 50-53 of the Addition to the
Town of Las Vegas; proceeding south through unplatted land, dissipating
beyond the intersection of S. Pacific and U.S. 85."

"Significance; Work on the Acequia Madre, or main irrigation ditch,
undoubtly started the first or second year of settlement (1835-36), such
was its importance to a traditional Hispanic farming village. An east
side ditch and another on the west side, La Acequia Nuestra Senora de
Los Dolores, were constructed later, but both disappeared by the mid-1920s. The Acequia Madre appears as a property boundary in deeds
from the 1850s; were it served this secondary function, its location has
probably not changed."

"The system starts with a rubble stone diversion dam on the
Gallinas River due east of Taos Street. The earthen ditch itself, from
three to five feet wide and two to three feet deep, wends its way south
parallel to the river. In some communities, the ditch association, with
its elected leader or mayordomo served as a quasi-governmental
institution which sometimes became a focal point for resistance to
Anglo-American control. In West Las Vegas, where the Spanish-speaking
population retained a large measure of political control, the ditch
association has remained a secondary institution. That the association
and the ditch still operate, bringing water to fields along the river,
represents a still vital aspect of the original Hispanic village."

The National Register listing is defined narrowly to include just the waterway and its embankments.

The Eugenio Gatignole House is one historic house directly adjacent to the acequia (and its National Register photo also shows the acequia).

References

Irrigation canals
Irrigation in the United States
National Register of Historic Places in San Miguel County, New Mexico
Buildings and structures completed in 1835